Simbirsk Chuvash teacher's school is the training center for the creative intelligentsia of the Chuvash and other peoples of the Volga region. Center founded educator of Chuvash people I. Y. Yakovlev, October 28, 1868 in Simbirsk, the administrative center of the homonymous province.

History 
In 1868, Ivan Yakovlev schoolboy at his apartment in Simbirsk began to teach Chuvash children. In 1871, the Ministry of Education gives official status Simbirsk Chuvash school. After nine years, it is converted to a teacher-training college.

Great contribution to its formation and development have I. Ulyanov, who worked in the 1869–1886 years Director and inspector of schools Simbirsk province, as well as Vishevsky I.V., Ilminsky N.I., Shestanov P. D.

Simbirsk’s school became a kind of national universities, academies, conservatories, theater for the Chuvash people.

Famous graduates 
 Nikolai Yut – Chuvash writer, Chairman of the Union of Chuvash writers (1923-1925)
 Arcady Aris – Chuvash writer, Chairman of the Union of Chuvash writers (1925-1933)
 Nikolay Shooboushynni – Chuvash writer, Chairman of the Union of Chuvash writers (1933-1934)
 Maximof-Koshkinsky, Joachim S. – the organizer of the Chuvash professional theater, the studio "Chuvashkino".
 Rekeev Aleksey Vasilevich – Chuvash educator, church and public figure, a priest, a missionary.
 Konstantin Vasilyevich Ivanov – Chuvash poet, classic of the Chuvash literature.

See also 
 Union of the Writers of the Chuvash Republic

Literature 
 Яковлев И. Я. Война и чувашская школа в Симбирске. Симбирск : типо-лит. Губ.правл., 1915. — 30 с
 Петров М. П. Симбирская чувашская учительская школа и И. Я. Яковлев. — Чебоксары, 1928.
 Андреева З. А. Иван Яковлевич Яковлев и Симбирская чувашская школа. — Чебоксары, 1949. — 144 с.
 Яковлев И. Я. Симбирская учительская школа и ее роль в просвещении чуваш / Под ред. М. Я. Сироткина; Науч.-исслед. ин-т языка, литературы, истории и экономики при Сов. Мин. Чуваш. АССР. Чебоксары :Чувашгосиздат, 1959. — 144 с
 Муромцев Н. В. Симбирская чувашская учительская школа : (к 100-летию осн.перв. чуваш. пед. учеб. заведения и 120-летию его основателя — И. Я. Яковлева) / М-во высш. и сред. спец. образования РСФСР; Чуваш. гос. ун-т им. И. Н. Ульянова; Науч.-исслед. ин-т при Совете Министров Чуваш. АССР. — Чебоксары, 1968. — 44 с.
 Иван Яковлевич Яковлев и его школа : Итоги юбил. науч. сессии, посвященной 120-летию со дня рождения И. Я. Яковлева и 100-летию Симбирской чувашской учительской школы : Сборник статей. — Чебоксары : Чувашкнигоиздат, 1971. — 303 с.
 Яковлев И. Я. симбирская центральная чувашская школа : материалы научн. конф. — Чебоксары, 1997. — 58 с
 Краснов Н. Г. Иван Яковлев и его потомки : посвящ. 150-летию со дня рождения чувашского педагога-просветителя. — Чебоксары : Чуваш. кн. изд-во, 1998. 353 c.
 Димитриев В. Д. Просветитель чувашского народа И. Я. Яковлев : сборник статей. — Чебоксары : Изд-во ЧГУ, 2002. — 140 с.
 Агаева Е.В., Сергеев Т.С. Симбирская чувашская школа – центр подготовки творческой интеллигенции // Фундаментальные исследования. – 2009. – № 7. – С. 84-85;

References

External links 
 Музей "Симбирская чувашская школа. Квартира И.Я. Яковлева"
 Симбирская чувашская школа. Квартира И.Я. Яковлева
 Симбирской чувашской учительской школе - 140 лет
 Музей «Симбирская чувашская школа. Квартира И.Я. Яковлева»
 Музей «Симбирская чувашская школа. Квартира И.Я. Яковлева»

Ulyanovsk
1868 establishments in the Russian Empire
Teachers colleges in Russia
Buildings and structures in Ulyanovsk Oblast